The Danang Dragons are a Vietnamese professional basketball team based in Danang, Vietnam. They play in the Vietnam Basketball Association.

Season-by-season record

Current roster

References

Basketball teams established in 2016
2016 establishments in Vietnam
Basketball teams in Vietnam
Vietnam Basketball Association teams